Ettore De Maria Bergler (1850–1938) was an Italian painter, known for his Stilo Liberty (Art Nouveau) painting, but also proficient in genre and landscapes.

Biography

He was born in Naples. He trained under Antonio Leto and Francesco Lojacono. His father was a town mayor in Sicily, while his mother was born in Vienna

He specialized in landscape, but also did portraits and genre scenes. In Palermo he painted frescoes for the Villa Malfitano Whitaker, and for the Massimo theater between 1899 and 1900. In 1908 he frescoed Liberty-style floral themes for the Grand Hotel Villa Igiea. From 1913 to 1931 he taught figurative painting at the Academy of Fine Arts in Palermo. Among his pupils was Michele Dixitdomino.

References

Other projects

19th-century Italian painters
Italian male painters
20th-century Italian painters
Painters from Naples
1850 births
1938 deaths
19th-century Italian male artists
20th-century Italian male artists